King of Horrorcore II is second mixtape by horrorcore rap artist King Gordy from Detroit. The album is a follow up to his 2005 release The King of Horrorcore!.

Track listing

References

External links

King Gordy albums
2009 mixtape albums
Sequel albums